Pandin and Yambo are twin crater lakes separated by a narrow strip of land. They are part of the Seven Lakes system in San Pablo, and are situated at Brgy. San Lorenzo in San Pablo City of Laguna province in the Philippines.

Lake Pandin is said to be "the most pristine" of the seven lakes of San Pablo.

Pandin Lake
Pandin has an area of 20.5 hectares and a maximum depth of 63 meters. It has a calculated volume of 6,600 cubic meters of water in storage.

Pandin is considered oligotrophic because of the abundant plant and fish life.

Yambo Lake
Yambo has a normal surface area of 28.5 hectares.

Yambo, like pandin is considered oligotrophic, and is suitable for swimming, outings, and picnics.

Legend of the Lakes
It was told that these two lakes were named after two lovers. According to the legend, a beautiful woman named Pandin was cursed not to step on the earth, otherwise, something terrible would befall her. Yambo, her ardent lover, did not know about the curse and had made her step on earth, after which there was a terrible noise followed by the cracking grumble of the earth and a heavy downpour eventually converted the area into twin lakes separated from each other by a bare strip of land.

Notes

References
The Legend of Pandin and Yambo
San Pablo City

External links
Geographic data related to Lake Pandin at OpenStreetMap
Geographic data related to Lake Yambo at OpenStreetMap

Pandin and Yambo
Volcanic crater lakes
Maars of the Philippines
Volcanic lakes of the Philippines